Cuisery is a commune in the Saône-et-Loire department in the region of Bourgogne-Franche-Comté in eastern France.

Geography
Cuisery is located on the river Seille on the left bank of the Saône River across from Tournus. It is in the southwest corner of the arrondissement of Louhans in the area known as Bresse.

Culture
Cuisery is one of the towns that have established a reputation as a "book town"  or "village du livres". Antiquarian booksellers, used book sellers, printers, book binding artisans and small presses gravitated here. By 1999, the town's identity was forged as a center for books and artists. Each month, typically during the first week of the month, there is a grand booksellers market. The town dates to the Middle Ages.

Popular culture
 The Little Paris Bookshop, a work of romantic fiction by Nina George and translated by Simon Pare, includes a chapter describing a visit to Cuisery.

See also
Communes of the Saône-et-Loire department

References

Communes of Saône-et-Loire